Sumner is a city in Lawrence County, Illinois, United States. The population was 3,174 at the 2010 census, with approximately 2,000 of that population being inmates at the Lawrence Correctional Center.

History

Sumner was established as a stop along the Ohio and Mississippi Railway in the early 1850s.  Initially known as "Black Jack" when a post office was opened in 1852, the city was renamed for Benjamin Sumner, an early settler, in 1855.  Sumner incorporated in 1887.

Geography
Sumner  lies along Illinois State Route 250, just south of its junction with U.S. Route 50 to the north.  Red Hills State Park is located just to the northeast.

Demographics

As of the census of 2000, there were 1,022 people, 369 households, and 238 families residing in the city. The racial makeup of the city was 97.16% White, 1.96% African American, 0.49% from other races, and 0.39% from two or more races. Hispanic or Latino of any race were 0.68% of the population.

There were 369 households, out of which 32.2% had children under the age of 18 living with them, 48.0% were married couples living together, 11.7% had a female householder with no husband present, and 35.5% were non-families. 32.5% of all households were made up of individuals, and 17.9% had someone living alone who was 65 years of age or older. The average household size was 2.40 and the average family size was 3.00.

In the city, the population was spread out, with 23.0% under the age of 18, 8.0% from 18 to 24, 26.1% from 25 to 44, 23.9% from 45 to 64, and 19.0% who were 65 years of age or older. The median age was 39 years. For every 100 females, there were 89.3 males. For every 100 females age 18 and over, there were 83.9 males.

The median income for a household in the city was $25,489, and the median income for a family was $36,667. Males had a median income of $23,068 versus $21,999 for females—although Lawrence County ranks as one of the worst in the country for men of prime working age, 25-54, who are willing to work, according to a New York Times study, which shows 84 percent of that gender and age group not in the workforce.  The per capita income for the city was $14,808. About 13.5% of families and 16.9% of the population were below the poverty line, including 26.2% of those under age 18 and 14.5% of those age 65 or over.

Sumner is sometimes reported as the American town with the highest male-to-female ratio. Males represent about 90 percent of the population when the figures include the Lawrence Correctional Center.

In the arts
In 2011–2013, the "found footage" horror film Unlisted Owner was filmed in and around Sumner by Jed Brian's production company Lawford County Productions. The film received a distribution agreement from Tom Cat Films in October 2016.

Notable people
 Lee Martin, author of several books, most notably The Bright Forever.
 Lester and Walter Melrose, music producers, born in Sumner

References

External links

 Official website

Cities in Lawrence County, Illinois
Cities in Illinois
1887 establishments in Illinois